Paul Simons may refer to:

Paul E. Simons, American diplomat and government official
Paul Simons (resistance fighter), Dutch resistance fighter

See also
Paul Simmons (disambiguation)